Khoor-e Olya (also Romanized as Khoor-e ‘Olyā; also known as Khoor-e Bālā and Khowr-e Bālā) is a village in Tabadkan Rural District, in the Central District of Mashhad County, Razavi Khorasan Province, Iran. At the 2006 census, its population was 1,180, in 288 families.

References 

Populated places in Mashhad County